The Score is a 2001 American heist film directed by Frank Oz, and starring Robert De Niro, Edward Norton, Angela Bassett, and Marlon Brando in his final film role. It was the only time that Brando and De Niro appeared onscreen together. The screenplay was based on a story by Daniel E. Taylor and Kario Salem.

Plot 
After nearly being caught during a burglary, master safe-cracker Nick Wells considers retiring to live with his girlfriend Diane and run his Montréal jazz club as a legitimate businessman. He declines another job from his fence Max, and is approached by the job's mastermind Jack Teller, an ambitious fellow thief. Nick sends his associate Burt to intimidate Jack into leaving town, but Jack gains the upper hand and arrives at Nick's home to change his mind. Nick agrees to join the heist in exchange for total control of the operation, and negotiates a $6 million cut from Max.

Their target is a royal sceptre smuggled into Canada but discovered by customs, now stored in the ultra-secure basement of the Montréal Customs House. Jack has infiltrated the Customs House by posing as a mentally-challenged janitor, and Nick finds access to the basement through the sewers beneath. Diane, disappointed that Nick has taken on this final score, reconsiders their future together.

Nick recruits Steven, a hacker associate, who breaks into the Customs House security company's system to obtain bypass codes, but is caught by a systems administrator who demands $50,000 for the information. The administrator arranges to meet in a public park, bringing his cousin for protection; tensions arise when the cousin and Jack each reveal they have brought a gun, to Nick's displeasure, but the exchange is made.

After seeing a pressurized beer keg burst open in the street, Nick concocts a plan to defeat the Customs House's impregnable safe. He frustrates Jack by urging patience and refusing to let him be part of the handoff with Max, despite Jack's insistence. Advised by Burt that the job may be too risky, Nick confronts Max, who confesses that he is deeply in debt to a mob boss but is secretly selling the sceptre for $30 million. Max implores him to finish the job, and Nick reluctantly agrees.

The Customs House adds additional closed-circuit television cameras and infrared detectors to the basement after realizing the sceptre's true value as a French national treasure, forcing the thieves to move up their timetable. Jack arrives for his graveyard shift — with his gun hidden inside a portable radio — while Nick breaks into the basement through the sewer tunnels. Burt, posing as a garbage truck driver, delivers computer components that Jack uses to bypass the security system. Jack shuts off the cameras as Nick enters the storage room, but a fellow janitor stumbles upon Jack, who locks him in a closet at gunpoint.

Bypassing the infrared sensors, Nick fills the safe with water from the basement sprinkler system and inserts a depth charge, blowing off the door. He packs the sceptre in a carrying case but is held at gunpoint by Jack, who forces him to hand over the case. As rigged by Jack, the cameras and alarms turn back on, alerting security and forcing Nick to escape back through the sewers; Jack returns upstairs, hiding the case inside his uniform and slipping past the police as they arrive.

Arriving at a bus station to flee the city, Jack calls Nick to gloat, but Nick reveals that he anticipated his betrayal: he had already planned a route through the sewers to evade pursuit, and Jack opens the case to discover a scrap metal decoy; Nick still has the real sceptre. Brushing off Jack's threats of vengeance, Nick advises him to flee as "every cop in the city" will now be looking for him. Later, Max smiles as he watches a news broadcast reporting a massive manhunt to find Jack, the prime suspect, whose accomplice has "vanished without a trace," while Nick reunites with Diane at Montréal-Mirabel International Airport.

Cast

Production 
During the production, Brando repeatedly argued with Oz and called him "Miss Piggy", the Muppet whom Oz played from 1976 to 2001. Brando's eccentric behavior on set included performing scenes in his underwear and altogether refusing to be directed by Oz at times, having co-star De Niro take over with Oz instructing via an assistant director, an allegation that Oz confirmed. "There was one scene–two days of shooting–when Marlon was too upset with me to act while I was on the set," Oz stated. "I watched from outside, with a monitor, and Bob was very good and acted as mediator between us."

Screenwriter Scott Marshall Smith joined the crew late and received a writing credit.

Oz downplayed the conflict after the film's release, taking unspoken note of the reported tension on the movie's Montreal set: 

Oz later blamed himself for the tension and cited his tendency to be confrontational rather than nurturing in response to Brando's acting style.

Home media 
The film was released on VHS and DVD on December 11, 2001.

Reception

Box office 
In its opening weekend, the film opened at #2 in the U.S. box office raking in $19 million, behind Legally Blonde. After its July 13, 2001 opening, the $68 million film earned a gross domestic box office take of $71,107,711. Combined with the international box office, the worldwide total is $113,579,918.

Critical response 
On Rotten Tomatoes the film has a "Certified Fresh" 73% rating based on 128 reviews, with an average rating of 6.5/10. The website's critical consensus reads, "Though the movie treads familiar ground in the heist/caper genre, De Niro, Norton, and Brando make the movie worth watching." On Metacritic the film has a score of 71% based on reviews from 29 critics.

Roger Ebert of the Chicago Sun-Times gave it three and a half stars, calling it "the best pure heist movie in recent years."

Peter Travers, film critic for Rolling Stone, pointed out that when "two Don Corleones team up," he expected "the kind of movie that makes people say, 'I'd pay to see these guys just read from the phone book.'" However, he concluded, "There's nothing you can't see coming in this flick, including the surprise ending. Quick, somebody get a phone book."

Accolades 
 
Angela Bassett won a NAACP Image Award for Outstanding Supporting Actress in a Motion Picture for her portrayal of DeNiro's girlfriend, Diane.

References

External links 

 
 
 

2001 films
2001 crime thriller films
2000s English-language films
2000s heist films
American crime thriller films
American heist films
Films directed by Frank Oz
Films scored by Howard Shore
Films set in Montreal
Films shot in Montreal
Films with screenplays by Lem Dobbs
Mandalay Pictures films
Paramount Pictures films
2000s American films